Craft Recordings is a record label owned by Concord. Like UMe, Legacy Recordings and Rhino Entertainment, Craft is specialized in reissues of Concord's back catalog. The imprint was founded in 2017, along with an online store by the same name offering a curated selection of deluxe CD and vinyl box sets, stand-alone LPs, as well as legacy label and artist merchandise. Its first release was a deluxe vinyl edition of Thelonious Monk and John Coltrane’s Complete 1957 Recordings. Sig Sigworth is the president of Craft Recordings.

Craft is home to numerous legacy labels including Contemporary Records, Fania Records, Fantasy Records, HighTone Records, Independiente, Milestone Records, Dischord Records, Musart, Nitro Records, Pablo, Panart Records, Prestige Records, Riverside, SLG, Specialty Records, Stax Records, Sugar Hill, Takoma, Telarc, Vanguard, Vee Jay and Victory Records. Craft is also the releasing arm for catalog titles from Concord's frontline labels, including Concord Records, Fearless Records and Rounder Records.

Craft has reissued albums by Creedence Clearwater Revival, Vince Guaraldi, John Lee Hooker, Little Richard, John Coltrane, R.E.M., Evanescence, The Offspring, Nine Inch Nails, and others. Not only reissuing material from catalog Concord artists, but also releasing rare material from them.

On June 26, 2019, Craft digitally reissued many albums of the legendary Stax soul label, Craft has also reissued, on vinyl, Stax's two-LP compilation from 1969, Soul Explosion, which compiled the label's biggest hits of that time onto the first disc, coupled with rare, hard-to-find tracks on the second. In August 2019, the Craft Latino imprint announced that it would re-release several Fania Records albums by Celia Cruz, Tito Puente, Johnny Pacheco, and Willie Colón.

External links
 Official website

Notes

Record labels established in 2017